The 2002 Belgian Supercup was a football match between the winners of the previous season's Belgian First Division and Belgian Cup competitions. The match was contested by Cup winners Club Brugge, and 2001–02 Belgian First Division champions, Genk on 3 August 2002 at the ground of the league champions as usual, in this case the Fenix stadium.

Club Brugge won its 10th Belgian Super Cup, following late goals by Ebrima Ebou Sillah and Olivier De Cock.

Details

See also
2001–02 Belgian First Division
2001–02 Belgian Cup

References

Belgian Super Cup 2003
K.R.C. Genk matches
Belgian Super Cup, 2003
August 2002 sports events in Europe
Belgian Supercup